Bair Badënov (Baír Dorzhíyevich Badyónov, ; born June 28, 1976, in Zugalay, now Zabaykalsky Krai) is a Russian archer.

Badënov was a World Champion among Youth in 1993, a European champion in 1996. Participated in 1996 Olympics in Atlanta and was 4th in 2000 Olympics in Sydney. In 2007 he won the World Cup in Turkey, and silver in individual competition at the European competitions in Turin, Italy.

2008 Summer Olympics
At the 2008 Summer Olympics in Beijing Badënov finished his ranking round with a total of 658 points. This gave him the 31st seed for the final competition bracket in which he faced Laurence Godfrey in the first round, beating the British 114-109. In the second round Badënov defeated second seed Mangal Singh Champia with 109-108 and reached the semi finals by beating Jason Lyon (115-110) and Cheng Chu Sian (109-104) in the third round and quarter final. In the semi final he and Viktor Ruban both came to 112 points in the regular match and had to go to an extra round. In this extra round Badënov scored 18 points, while Ruban advanced to the final with 20 points. Ruban would win the final and take the Olympic gold.

He also took part in the team event. With his 658 score from the ranking round combined with the 660 of Abramov and the 671 of Tsyrempilov Russia was in fourth position after the ranking round, which gave them a straight seed into the quarter finals. However, with 217-209 they were beaten by the team from China that eventually won the bronze medal.

References

External links 
 
 

1976 births
Living people
People from Zabaykalsky Krai
Buryat sportspeople
Russian male archers
Olympic archers of Russia
Olympic bronze medalists for Russia
Archers at the 1996 Summer Olympics
Archers at the 2000 Summer Olympics
Archers at the 2008 Summer Olympics
Olympic medalists in archery
Medalists at the 2008 Summer Olympics
Sportspeople from Zabaykalsky Krai